Below are the rosters for the UNCAF Nations Cup 1995 tournament in San Salvador, El Salvador, from November 29 to December 10, 1995.

Group A

Head coach: Winston Michael
GK Carlos Slusher 28/01/1971 Belize
DF Pablo Madrid 09/11/1968 Sagitun Belize
DF Michael Kelly 01/03/1969 Belmopan Bandits Belize
DF Nelson Moss 27/01/1969 Griga United Belize
DF Edwardo Swift 18/01/1969 San Pedro Sea Dogs Belize
DF Martin Nolberto 22/06/1966 Belize Defence Force
DF Findlay Gladden 19/08/1972 Verdes FC Belize
MF Orlando Pinelo 24/07/1968 Belize
MF Denmark Casey 22/11/1971 Verdes FC Belize
MF Jorge Garcia 02/09/1969 Verdes FC Belize
MF Edmond Pandy 24/05/1967 Juventus FC Belize
MF Deron Jones 05/10/1970 Verdes FC Belize
MF Clifford Usher 11/08/1971 Nizhee Corozal Belize
FW David Rodriguez Benque 06/03/1970 DC United Belize
FW Norman Nuñez Pipesburgh 12/06/1971 Suga Boys Juventus Belize
FW Joseph West 18/08/1963 Belize Defense Force Belize
FW David McCauley 14/05/1967 San Felipe Barcelona Belize

Head coach: Toribio Rojas

Head coach:José Omar Pastoriza

GK Adolfo Humberto Menendez 13/04/1970 CD FAS El Salvador
GK Raul Antonio Garcia 13/09/1962 CD Aguila El Salvador
DF Jose Roberto Hernandez 15/09/1968 CD Aguila El Salvador
DF Leonel Carcamo Batres 05/05/1965 CD Luis Angel Firpo El Salvador
DF William Adalberto Osorio 13/04/1971 CD FAS El Salvador
DF Geovanny Trigueros Martinez 08/12/1966 CD Luis Angel Firpo El Salvador
DF Jaime Bladmir Cubias 10/03/1974 CD FAS El Salvador
DF Mario Ernesto Mayen 19/05/1968 Alianza FC El Salvador
MF Jorge Humberto Rodriguez 20/05/1971 CD FAS El Salvador
MF Wilfredo Iraheta Sanabria 22/02/1967 CD Aguila El Salvador
MF Jose Guillermo Rivera  25/11/1969 CD FAS El Salvador
MF Jose Mauricio Cienfuegos 12/02/1968 CD Luis Angel Firpo El Salvador
MF Marlon Menjivar 16/02/1962 CD Luis Angel Firpo El Salvador
MF Erber Alfredo Burgos 08/04/1969 CD FAS El Salvador
FW Ronald Osvaldo Cerritos 03/01/1975 ADET El Salvador
FW Raul Ignacio Diaz Arce 01/02/1970 CD Luis Angel Firpo El Salvador
FW William Alexander Renderos 03/10/1971 CD FAS El Salvador

Group B

Head coach: Jorge Roldán

Head coach: Carlos Cruz Carranza

Head coach: César Maturana
GK Martin Leonel Tuñon 07/02/1972 Arabe Unido Panama 
GK Ricardo James 07/05/1966 CD Platense Honduras
DF Jose Mario Anthony Torres 27/08/1972 CD Platense Honduras
DF Rogelio Clarke 09/02/1964 Arabe Unido Panama
DF Franklin Ulises Delgado 18/02/1966 Municipal Limeño El Salvador
DF Luis Carlos Sanchez 09/01/1974 Deportivo Cucuta Colombia
DF Fernando Bolivar 17/02/1967 Euro Kickers Panama
DF Noel Bartley 10/10/1970 Club San Francisco Panama
DF Leonel Phillips 12/12/1970 Arabe Unido Panama
MF Abdul Chiari 13/01/1971 Arabe Unido Panama
MF Frank Lozada 06/10/1965 Puntarenas FC Costa Rica
MF Mauro Quiroz 12/12/1970 Arabe Unido Panama
GK Rogelio Iguala 16/02/1967 Euro Kickers Panama
MF Oscar Salazar 02/06/1969 San Francisco Panama
MF Julio Medina 14/07/1976 Arabe Unido Panama
MF Ruben Elias Guevara 27/01/1964 Tauro FC Panama
MF Angel Luis Rodriguez 15/02/1976 Tauro FC Panama
FW Walter Pino 03/08/1978 Arabe Unido Panama
FW Percivall Antonio Piggott  23/11/1966 CD Luis Angel Firpo El Salvador
FW Oscar Salazar 02/06/1969 San Francisco Panama
FW Jorge Luis Dely Valdez 12/03/1967 Cerezo Osaka Japon
FW Ferdin Sanchez 12/12/1976 Altamira FC Panama
FW Armando Javier Dely Valdez 05/01/1964 Panama
FW Erick Ortega 27/02/1968 Panama
FW Jose Faraux 13/02/1971 Rio Abajo Panama
FW Agustin Salinas 17/05/1974 Panama
FW Julio Cesar Dely Valdes 12/03/1967 Cagliari Calcio Italia

Footnotes

References
RSSSF Archive

1995 UNCAF Nations Cup
Copa Centroamericana squads